Laura Hottenrott (born 14 May 1992) is a German long-distance runner. In 2020, she competed in the women's half marathon at the 2020 World Athletics Half Marathon Championships held in Gdynia, Poland.

In 2017, she won the bronze medal in the women's marathon at the 2017 German Athletics Championships. In 2018, she competed in the women's marathon at the 2018 European Athletics Championships held in Berlin, Germany. She did not finish her race.

References

External links 
 

Living people
1992 births
Place of birth missing (living people)
German female middle-distance runners
German female long-distance runners
German female marathon runners
21st-century German women